Apache Celix is an open-source implementation of the OSGi specification adapted to C and C++ developed by the Apache Software Foundation. The project aims to provide a framework to develop (dynamic) modular software applications using component and/or service-oriented programming.

Apache Celix is primarily developed in C and adds an additional abstraction, in the form of a library, to support for C++.

Modularity in Apache Celix is achieved by supporting - run-time installed - bundles. Bundles are zip files and can contain software modules in the form of shared libraries. Modules can provide and request dynamic services, for and from other modules, by interacting with a provided bundle context. Services in Apache Celix are "plain old" structs with function pointers or "plain old C++ Objects" (POCO).

History 
Apache Celix was welcomed in the Apache Incubator at November 2010 and graduated to Top Level Project from the Apache Incubator in July 2014.

References 

 "Prose in this article was copied from this source, which is released under an Apache License, Version 2.0"

External links 
 
 

Celix
Embedded systems
Free software
Service-oriented architecture-related products